Paul Ego (birth name Paul Jones) is a Billy T Award winning New Zealand comedian. He is best known both for his current role as leader of Team One on the New Zealand comedy current affairs panel show 7 Days, and as the voice artist of the Stickman in television advertisements for PAK'nSAVE supermarket.

Ego's first gig was in London in 1994 and upon returning to New Zealand in 1995 he soon became a regular sight on the pro-comedy skyline. Ego's Breakfast Radio career began in 2000 with his role on the Kim & Corbett Breakfast Show on Auckland's More FM. His role on the award-winning show involved writing comedy scripts and voicing many of the shows regular characters. In 2006 Paul moved to NZ's Rock Network and he is now one quarter of ’The Morning Rumble’, the 1 Music Breakfast Show in the country. According to his website, he was "parolled in 2011,", in order to "get to know his family again in the mornings."

In the early months of 2013 he co-starred alongside Jeremy Corbett in a comedy show called The Radio.
Ego has been married for 25 years, and has two sons; on his website, he claims to be a "loving but mostly ineffective father." He lives in the wealthy North Auckland suburb of Devonport, a source of several jokes from his fellow 7 Days colleagues.

Awards 
2000 Billy T award winner.

2008 WINNER Best Music & Entertainment Hosts, Metropolitan -2008 NZ Radio Awards.

References

External links 
Official website
Paul Ego's Radio reviews (herock.net.nz)
Jeremy Corbett and Paul Ego (tv3.co.nz)
2009 NZ Comedy Guild Award Winners Announced (theatreview.org.nz)

Living people
New Zealand comedians
1966 births